Patricia Hidalgo Candelo (born 8 December 1998) is a Spanish footballer who plays as a midfielder for Rayo Vallecano.

Club career
Hidalgo started her career at La Cruz Villanovense.

References

External links
Profile at La Liga

1998 births
Living people
Women's association football midfielders
Spanish women's footballers
People from Villanueva de la Serena
Sportspeople from the Province of Badajoz
Footballers from Extremadura
Atlético Madrid Femenino players
Rayo Vallecano Femenino players
Primera División (women) players
Alhama CF players
21st-century Spanish women